Parliamentary elections were held in Nauru on 24 August 2019. President Baron Waqa lost his seat in Boe Constituency, making him ineligible for a third term. Following the elections, Lionel Aingimea was elected President, winning a parliamentary vote 12–6 against David Adeang.

Electoral system
The 19 members of Parliament were elected from eight multi-member constituencies using the Dowdall system, a version of ranked voting; voters rank candidates, with the votes counted as a fraction of one divided by the ranking number (e.g. a candidate ranked second will be scored as ½); the candidates with the highest total were elected.

Results

Aiwo

Anabar

Anetan

Boe

Buada

Meneng

Ubenide

Yaren

References

Nauru
2019 in Nauru
Elections in Nauru
Non-partisan elections